WXRJ-LP (94.9 FM, "Real Radio") is a radio station broadcasting an urban adult contemporary music format. Licensed to Bloomington, Illinois, United States, the station serves the Bloomington area. The station is currently owned by Black Business Alliance, Inc.

References

External links
 
 

XRJ-LP
XRJ-LP
Urban adult contemporary radio stations in the United States
Bloomington–Normal